Airplane olive, also known as licorice olive, is a popular snack in Hong Kong and Guangzhou. The snack physically resembles an olive, but is actually made from herbs marinated with salt and licorice. The name "airplane olive" originates from a custom of street vendors throwing the snack to customers above, to their home, who would throw money down for payment. Such act is made possible as buildings then were usually not too high.

Airplane olives have been referred to as "flying olives", or feijilan, which literally means "airplane-olive."

References

Hong Kong cuisine